Vandelli is an Italian surname. Notable people with the surname include:

 Maurizio Vandelli (born 1964), Italian cyclist
 Bruno Vandelli (1961), French dancer and choreographer
 Claudio Vandelli (born 1961), Italian cyclist
 Marcello Vandelli (1958), Italian artist and pop painter
 Maurizio Vandelli (born 1944), Italian pop singer
 Domenico Vandelli (1735–1816), Italian naturalist

Italian-language surnames